Sean Patrick Fannon is an American role-playing game designer and writer. He has been working in the gaming industry since 1988, and is best known for his work with the Savage Worlds game system, including his epic fantasy setting, Shaintar, and his conversion of the classic game Rifts. He has also worked as a designer in the video game industry and a consultant in the film industry.

Personal life
Fannon was born on January 4, 1966, in Tennessee. He began playing role-playing games in 1977. Before becoming a successful game designer, he worked as a deputy sheriff, airline agent, and armored car driver. He attended West Point from 1984 to 1986. He currently lives in Littleton, Colorado.

Career in role-playing games

Early works
Fannon's career in the gaming industry began in 1988, writing freelance articles and reviews for small-press magazines. He then wrote multiple books for Hero Games' Champions RPG, which led to a job as the Continuity Director of the Champions Universe line. He also wrote books for the Shatterzone RPG and the original Star Wars RPG from West End Games and articles for Shadis Magazine, Adventurer's Club Magazine, and TSR's Dragon Magazine.

In 1995, Fannon wrote The Fantasy Roleplaying Gamer's Bible, an introduction to the role-playing hobby, for Prima Entertainment. A second edition of the book was published by Obsidian Studios in 1999.  This book has been cited as a good introductory guide to roleplaying games for people that are not roleplayers.

Multimedia company IEI's games division 8th Wonder Games hired Fannon in 1996 to target the role-playing games niche.

Fannon was one of the staff to join new company FASA as it was being put together in 2012, with his role in marketing and promotion.

DriveThruRPG
From October 2008 until 2012 Fannon worked as a Marketing and Communications Manager for DriveThruRPG where he managed communications, promotions, marketing, and business development for RPG sites. This included helping to advertise projects like their "Gamers Help Haiti" program, which raised money to donate to Doctors Without Borders during their effort to provide medical support to the people of Haiti following the 2010 Haiti earthquake. This effort raised over $175,000. He also helped DriveThruRPG begin more active support of other charities, leading to them establishing permanent accounts with Hero Initiative, Feeding America, Red Cross, and Doctors Without Borders.

Shaintar
In 2005, Shaintar: Immortal Legends the first book set in Fannon's epic fantasy setting for Pinnacle Entertainment Group's Savage Worlds RPG, was published by Talisman Studios. In 2013, Savage Mojo began publishing the Shaintar line, starting with a successful Kickstarter campaign for Shaintar: Legends Unleashed. Two Shaintar books, Shaintar: Legends Arise and Shaintar: Legends Unleashed, were nominated for Ennie awards in 2014.

Evil Beagle Games
In 2012, Fannon started his own game company, Evil Beagle Games, with Carinn Seabolt, in Huntsville, Alabama. From 2014 to 2017, Ross Watson joined the company as Managing Director. In 2017, Evil Beagle Games became an LLC, with Sean, Bill Keyes, Leonard Pimental, and Michael Surbrook forming the company. In 2020 Evil Beagle LLC was restructured and expanded, and Jennifer Shinefeld was appointed CEO.

Savage Rifts
In 2016, Fannon's Evil Beagle Games partnered with Pinnacle Entertainment to produce Savage Rifts, which translated Palladium Books' classic Rifts setting to the Savage Worlds rules.

His involvement in Savage Rifts was featured in WIRED Magazine and in a WIRED interview.

Video games
Fannon worked as a designer for Interplay Productions (on a Star Trek adventure game), Vortex Media Arts (multiple titles, including a Tonka activity game), Infogrames Multimedia, 8th Wonder Games (Drachen Zor), and Telepathy Entertainment (Out There).

Honors
Fannon was the Game Designer Guest of Honor at MomoCon 2013, Gaming Guest of Honor for ConGlomeration in 2014, a featured guest at Cleveland ConCoction, the Gaming Guest of Honor for Con on the Cob in 2016, and 2017, a Celebrity Guest for Tacticon in 2017, a guest at Magic City Con, and a special guest at GenghisCon 2018, and at ChupacabraCon 2017.

Fannon was also part of an academic panel discussion at the 2018 Denver Comic Con with Professor James Fielder, Ph.D. of United States Air Force Academy about Social Sciences in Worlds that Never Were: Using Fantasy and Science Fiction Literature in the Classroom.

Bibliography

Savage Worlds role-playing books
Savage Worlds
Freedom Squadron
Freedom Squadron Commando's Manual
Freedom Squadron Plans & Operations Manual
Accursed
Accursed: The Guns of Dagerov
Accursed: Ill Omens
Savage Rifts
Savage Rifts: The Tomorrow Legion Player's Guide
Savage Rifts: Game Master's Handbook (Nominated for a 2017 ENnie award for Best Rules.)
Savage Rifts: Savage Foes of North America
Savage Rifts: Coalition Field Manual
Savage Rifts: Archetypes Set 1
Savage Rifts: Archetypes Set 2
A Fine Solution 1: Welcome to the World
A Fine Solution 2: The Circle of Death
A Fine Solution 3: Triangle Triad
A Fine Solution 4: Unwanted Heroes
A Fine Solution 5: Power Play
Shaintar
Shaintar: Legends Arise (Nominated for a 2014 ENnie award.)
Shaintar: Legends Unleashed (Nominated for a 2014 ENnie award.)
Shaintar Immortal Legends
Shaintar Atlas
Shaintar Black Lantern Report: Camden
Shaintar Black Lantern Report: Mercenary Companies
Shaintar Black Lantern Report: Origins of the Society
Shaintar: Dwarven Clanhomes
Shaintar Adventure: The Burning Heart
Shaintar Guidebook: Desert Princes
Shaintar Guidebook: Dregordia
Shaintar Guidebook: Eastport
Shaintar Guidebook: Elvish Nation
Shaintar Guidebook: The Freelands
Shaintar Guidebook: Galea
Shaintar Guidebook: Goblinesh
Shaintar Guidebook: Korindia
Shaintar Guidebook: Magic & Cosmology (Vol I)
Shaintar Guidebook: Malakar Dominion
Shaintar Guidebook: Mindoth's Tower
Shaintar Guidebook: Nazatir
Shaintar Guidebook: Olara
Shaintar Guidebook: Prelacy of Camon
Shaintar Guidebook: Serenity
Shaintar Guidebook: Shaya'Nor
Shaintar Guidebook: The Wildlands
Shaintar Anthology: Southern Kingdoms
Bloody Awful
Godstrike Tempest: Shaintar/Suzerain Crossover
Flame Down Below
Other Savage Worlds works
Crossbows, Crafting, and Ka-ZOT!
Day in the Life: Gaming the Downtime
Dungeonlands: Heroes And Servitors
Enascentia: Touch of Flame
Nova Praxis: Savage Worlds edition	
Fire in the Darkness
Savagely Useful: Random Magic Items

Other role-playing games
Aaron Allston's Strike Force (revised) (Winner of a 2016 BAMFsie award.)
Shatterzone: Arsenal
Shatterzone: GearTech
Champions: Champions Universe, 4th edition
Dark Heresy: Creatures Anathema (Winner of a 2009 ENnie award.)
Edge of the Empire: Suns of Fortune
Shards of the Stone: Core
Hero 4th edition: High Tech Enemies
Hero 4th edition: The Mutant File
Series Pitch of the Month: No Crowns
Cracken's Rebel Operatives (West End's Star Wars RPG)
Star Wars: Age of Rebellion
Star Wars: Edge of the Empire

Other works
A Better Game With Dice and Chips 2010
Bring Dice & Chips: The Holiday Collection 2011
The Fantasy Roleplaying Gamer's Bible
The Fantasy Roleplaying Gamer's Bible, 2nd edition
So Yer Wantin' t' Talk Like a Pirate!

References

External links

Personal sites 
 Sean's Pick of the Day (blog)

Commercial and professional sites 
 Evil Beagle Games (official site)
 Pinnacle Entertainment (official site)
 BoardGame Geek biography site

Interviews 
 Geek Pride interview
 Rogue Warden interview
 Ain't It Cool News interview
 d20 Radio interview
 The Hardboiled GMshoe interview
 Iced Jamb interview
 Mythwits interview (YouTube)
 The Wild Die interview (podcast)
 BAMF interview (podcast)
 Geek's Guide to the Galaxy - Sean Patrick Fannon
 Genretainment - Sean Patrick Fannon
 On the Shoulders of Dwarves - Savage Worlds: Freedom Squadron, with Sean Patrick Fannon (episode 20)
 Interrogation Droid: Sean Patrick Fannon

Role-playing game designers
Living people
1966 births